Chief Seattle (c. 1786–1866) was a Suquamish and Duwamish chief.

Chief Seattle may also refer to:

 Chief Seattle (fireboat), a fireboat
 Chief of the Suquamish – Chief Seattle
 Statue of Chief Seattle
 Chief Seattle, a book by Eva Greenslit Anderson
 "Chief Seattle", a song by jazz saxophonist Chris Potter from the 2007 album Song for Anyone
 A horse that finished second in the 1999 Breeders' Cup Juvenile